The Cathedral of Monzón (Catedral de Santa María del Romeral) is a Roman Catholic church located in the town of Monzón in the province of Huesca, autonomous community of Aragon, Spain.

History
Since 1995, this has been the co-cathedral of the diocese of Barbastro-Monzón, along with the Barbastro Cathedral.

The initial church was built in Romanesque style, but modified across the centuries. The apse has components of Gothic style. The church was made a collegiate church in 1607. In 1949, it was made a national monument.

See also
Catholic Church in Spain

References

12th-century Roman Catholic church buildings in Spain
Romanesque architecture in Aragon
Gothic architecture in Aragon
Monzón
Churches in Aragon